Mitzvah tantz (lit. "mitzvah-dance" in Yiddish) is the Hasidic custom of the men dancing before the bride on the wedding night, after the wedding feast. Commonly, the bride, who usually stands perfectly still at one end of the room, will hold one end of a long sash or a gartel while the one dancing before her holds the other end. There are times when one of the leading rabbis, usually her father or grandfather, will dance with her as well. The dance is usually a highly charged emotional moment, wherein the dancer prays silently for the couple's success in life.

Background

The custom evidently predates Hasidism, being mentioned first in the medieval Machzor Vitri, and has its basis in the Talmud (Ketubot), where there is an expression ketsad merakdim lifnei hakallah "how does one dance before the bride?" Although most Orthodox groups do not observe this practice, Hasidim have maintained a form of this ancient custom and consider a great honor to be able to dance in front of the bride to honor her on her wedding night, after the guests have departed. Custom dictates that only close relatives would participate in the dance.

Bride and groom rejoice

During the mitzvah tantz, the bride and all the women, are brought to the men's section and there is no mechitza separating them. In some instances the mechitza will be moved aside entirely with all the women present seated facing the men on the other side. If there is a large crowd at a wedding of a notable rabbi, most of the women will be looking down from a higher women's gallery.

The groom and most of his male relatives take turns rejoicing in front of the new bride at the time of the mitzvah tantz. In the case of the marriage of children or grandchildren of notable rebbes, this becomes an opportunity for the entire community, followers and admirers of the rabbis involved to watch and rejoice as the mitzvah tantz is done by the leading rebbes and rabbis in attendance. This may go on all night until dawn.

Mystical symbolism

The custom of honoring the bride is related to the notion of the Jewish Godhead having both male and female components that seek unification to be united as one, as God's "feminine nature" is called the Shechina (which is a feminine noun), and a marriage between a Jewish man and a Jewish woman is regarded as the symbol of a yichud ("unification") of God's "oneness" with the joining of the bride and the groom. By rejoicing in front of the bride and creating an atmosphere of happiness and joy at that moment in the wedding it is, as it were, as if one were rejoicing before the Shechina and the moment of its highest unification with utmost Godliness, which is a reason for great rejoicing. In addition, a Jewish groom and bride are considered to be as if they were a King and Queen on their marriage day, so by honoring them through dance one is honoring the "Queen" and her "King."

References

External links
Nagel, Ari. Mitzvah tantz. 13 August 2014. Multiple male guests dance with the bride, with a gartel.
Mitzvah Tantz Of Ger Tzedek R' Ezra Chaim Shlita Tamiz 5773. 12 June 2013. A male guest performs for the bride.

Hasidic Judaism
Jewish marital law
Ritual dances